Comparative Biochemistry and Physiology Part B: Biochemistry & Molecular Biology is a peer-reviewed scientific journal that covers research in biochemistry, physiology, and molecular biology.

External links 
 

Biochemistry journals
Physiology journals
Elsevier academic journals
Publications established in 1971